Nikša Dobud (born 5 August 1985) is a Croatian water polo player. At the 2012 Summer Olympics, he competed for the Croatia men's national water polo team in the men's event. He is  6'7" (200 cm) tall and weighs 276 lbs (125 kg).

In 2015, Dobud received a four-year suspension for attempting to evade a FINA drug test.

His suspension ended in as of April 2019. He then signed a contract to play for Italian water polo club Pro Recco. He also intended to play for Maltese club San Giljan in the summer.

See also
 Croatia men's Olympic water polo team records and statistics
 List of Olympic champions in men's water polo
 List of Olympic medalists in water polo (men)
 List of World Aquatics Championships medalists in water polo

References

NIKŠA DOBUD Život mi se promijenio preko noći. Ostao sam jak i stisnuo zube
Nikša Dobud i Tony Azevedo ujedinili su snage u projektu "Dubrovnik Waterpolo Island"

External links
 

1985 births
Living people
Sportspeople from Dubrovnik
Croatian male water polo players
Water polo centre forwards
Water polo players at the 2012 Summer Olympics
Medalists at the 2012 Summer Olympics
Olympic gold medalists for Croatia in water polo
World Aquatics Championships medalists in water polo
Competitors at the 2013 Mediterranean Games
Mediterranean Games medalists in water polo
Mediterranean Games gold medalists for Croatia
Doping cases in water polo
Croatian sportspeople in doping cases
Expatriate water polo players
Croatian expatriate sportspeople in Malta
Croatian expatriate sportspeople in Italy